Over stork og stein is a Norwegian comedy from 1994 directed by Eva Isaksen. The film had its premiere on 2 September 1994 at Saga kino.

Cast 
 Anneke von der Lippe – Liv
 Johannes Joner – Erling
 Dennis Storhøi – Torfinn
 Kari-Ann Grønsund – Jorunn
 Lars Sørbø – Marius
 Terje Strømdahl – Lyder
 Ivar Nørve – Fysioterapeut
 Ivar Sandvik – Edvard
 Anitra Eriksen – Eva
 Grethe Kausland – Astrid

References

External links 
 

Norwegian comedy films
1994 films
1994 comedy films